The Whigs were a political faction and then a political party in the Parliaments of England, Scotland, Ireland, Great Britain and the United Kingdom. Between the 1680s and the 1850s, the Whigs contested power with their rivals, the Tories. The Whigs merged into the Liberal Party with the Peelites and Radicals in the 1850s. Many Whigs left the Liberal Party in 1886 to form the Liberal Unionist Party, which merged into the Conservative Party in 1912.

The Whigs began as a political faction that opposed absolute monarchy and Catholic Emancipation, supporting constitutional monarchism with a parliamentary system. They played a central role in the Glorious Revolution of 1688 and were the standing enemies of the Roman Catholic Stuart kings and pretenders. The period known as the Whig Supremacy (1714–1760) was enabled by the Hanoverian succession of George I in 1714 and the failure of the Jacobite rising of 1715 by Tory rebels. The Whigs took full control of the government in 1715 and thoroughly purged the Tories from all major positions in government, the army, the Church of England, the legal profession and local political offices. The first great leader of the Whigs was Robert Walpole, who maintained control of the government from 1721 to 1742, and whose protégé, Henry Pelham, led the government from 1743 to 1754. Great Britain remained a single party state under the Whigs until King George III came to the throne in 1760 and allowed Tories back in. But the Whig Party's hold on power remained strong for many years thereafter. Thus historians have called the period from roughly 1714 to 1783 the "age of the Whig oligarchy".

By 1784, both the Whigs and Tories had become formal political parties, with Charles James Fox becoming the leader of a reconstituted Whig party arrayed against the new governing party of the new Tories led by William Pitt the Younger. The foundation of both parties depended more on the support of wealthy politicians than on popular votes. Although there were elections to the House of Commons, only a few men controlled most of the voters.

Both parties slowly evolved during the 18th century. In the beginning, the Whig Party generally tended to support the aristocratic families, the continued disenfranchisement of Catholics and toleration of nonconformist Protestants (dissenters such as the Presbyterians), while the Tories generally favoured the minor gentry and people who were (relatively speaking) smallholders; they also supported the legitimacy of a strongly established Church of England. (The so-called High Tories preferred high church Anglicanism, or Anglo-Catholicism. Some High Tories and Anglo-Catholics, adherents of the Non-juring schism, openly or covertly supported the exiled House of Stuart's claim to the throne—a position known as Jacobitism). Later, the Whigs came to draw support from the emerging industrial reformists and the mercantile class while the Tories came to draw support from farmers, landowners, royalists and (relatedly) those who favoured imperial military spending.

By the first half of the 19th century, the Whig programme had come to encompass the supremacy of parliament, free trade, the abolition of slavery, the expansion of the franchise (suffrage) and an acceleration of the move toward complete equal rights for Catholics (a reversal of the party's late-17th-century position, which had been militantly anti-Catholic).

Name 
The term Whig began as a short form of whiggamore, a term originally used by people in the north of England to refer to cattle drivers from western Scotland who came to Leith to buy corn (the Scottish cattle drivers would call out "Chuig" or "Chuig an bothar"—meaning "away" or "to the road"—this sounded to the English like "Whig", and they came to use the word "Whig" or "Whiggamore" derisively to refer to these people). During the English Civil Wars, when Charles I reigned, the term "Whig" was picked up and used by the English to refer derisively to a radical faction of the Scottish Covenanters who called themselves the Kirk Party (see the Whiggamore Raid). It was later applied to Scottish Presbyterian rebels who were against the king's Episcopalian order in Scotland.

The word Whig entered English political discourse during the Exclusion Bill crisis of 1678–1681: there was controversy about whether King Charles II's brother, James, Duke of York, should be allowed to succeed to the throne on Charles's death, and Whig became a term of abuse applied to those who wanted to exclude James on the grounds that he was a Roman Catholic. (Samuel Johnson, a fervent Tory, often joked that "the first Whig was the Devil".)

In his six-volume history of England, David Hume wrote:

Origins

Exclusion Crisis 

Under Lord Shaftesbury's leadership, the Whigs in the Parliament of England wished to exclude the Duke of York (who later became King James II) from the throne due to his Roman Catholicism, his favouring of monarchical absolutism, and his connections to France. They believed the heir presumptive, if allowed to inherit the throne, would endanger the Protestant religion, liberty and property.

The first Exclusion Bill was supported by a substantial majority on its second reading in May 1679. In response, King Charles prorogued Parliament and then dissolved it, but the subsequent elections in August and September saw the Whigs' strength increase. This new parliament did not meet for thirteen months, because Charles wanted to give passions a chance to die down. When it met in October 1680, an Exclusion Bill was introduced and passed in the Commons without major resistance, but was rejected in the Lords. Charles dissolved Parliament in January 1681, but the Whigs did not suffer serious losses in the ensuing election. The next Parliament first met in March at Oxford, but Charles dissolved it after only a few days, when he made an appeal to the country against the Whigs and determined to rule without Parliament. In February, Charles had made a deal with the French King Louis XIV, who promised to support him against the Whigs. Without Parliament, the Whigs gradually crumbled, mainly due to government repression following the discovery of the Rye House Plot. The Whig peers, the Earl of Melville, the Earl of Leven, and Lord Shaftesbury, and Charles II's illegitimate son the Duke of Monmouth, being implicated, fled to and regrouped in the United Provinces. Algernon Sidney, Sir Thomas Armstrong and William Russell, Lord Russell, were executed for treason. The Earl of Essex committed suicide in the Tower of London over his arrest for treason, whilst Lord Grey of Werke escaped from the Tower.

Glorious Revolution 

After the Glorious Revolution of 1688, Queen Mary II and King William III governed with both Whigs and Tories, despite the fact that many of the Tories still supported the deposed Roman Catholic James II. William saw that the Tories were generally friendlier to royal authority than the Whigs and he employed both groups in his government. His early ministry was largely Tory, but gradually the government came to be dominated by the so-called Junto Whigs, a group of younger Whig politicians who led a tightly organised political grouping. The increasing dominance of the Junto led to a split among the Whigs, with the so-called Country Whigs seeing the Junto as betraying their principles for office. The Country Whigs, led by Robert Harley, gradually merged with the Tory opposition in the later 1690s.

History

18th century 
Although William's successor Anne had considerable Tory sympathies and excluded the Junto Whigs from power, after a brief and unsuccessful experiment with an exclusively Tory government she generally continued William's policy of balancing the parties, supported by her moderate Tory ministers, the Duke of Marlborough and Lord Godolphin. However, as the War of the Spanish Succession went on and became less and less popular with the Tories, Marlborough and Godolphin were forced to rely more and more on the Junto Whigs, so that by 1708 they headed an administration of the Parliament of Great Britain dominated by the Junto. Anne herself grew increasingly uncomfortable with this dependence on the Whigs, especially as her personal relationship with the Duchess of Marlborough deteriorated. This situation also became increasingly uncomfortable to many of the non-Junto Whigs, led by the Duke of Somerset and the Duke of Shrewsbury, who began to intrigue with Robert Harley's Tories. In the spring of 1710, Anne dismissed Godolphin and the Junto ministers, replacing them with Tories.

The Whigs now moved into opposition and particularly decried the 1713 Treaty of Utrecht, which they attempted to block through their majority in the House of Lords. The Tory administration led by Harley and the Viscount Bolingbroke persuaded the Queen to create twelve new Tory peers to force the treaty through.

Liberal ideals 

The Whigs primarily advocated the supremacy of Parliament, while calling for toleration for Protestant dissenters. They adamantly opposed a Catholic as king. They opposed the Catholic Church because they saw it as a threat to liberty, or as Pitt the Elder stated: "The errors of Rome are rank idolatry, a subversion of all civil as well as religious liberty, and the utter disgrace of reason and of human nature".

Ashcraft and Goldsmith (1983) have traced in detail, in the period 1689 to 1710, the major influence of the liberal political ideas of John Locke on Whig political values, as expressed in widely cited manifestos such as "Political Aphorisms: or, the True Maxims of Government Displayed", an anonymous pamphlet that appeared in 1690 and was widely cited by Whigs. The 18th-century Whigs borrowed the concepts and language of universal rights employed by political theorists Locke and Algernon Sidney (1622–1682). By the 1770s the ideas of Adam Smith, a founder of classical liberalism became important. As Wilson and Reill (2004) note: "Adam Smith's theory melded nicely with the liberal political stance of the Whig Party and its middle-class constituents".

Samuel Johnson (1709–1784), a leading London intellectual, repeatedly denigrated the "vile" Whigs and praised the Tories, even during times of Whig political supremacy. In his great Dictionary (1755), Johnson defined a Tory as "one who adheres to the ancient Constitution of the state and the apostolical hierarchy of the Church of England, opposed to a Whig". He linked 18th-century Whiggism with 17th-century revolutionary Puritanism, arguing that the Whigs of his day were similarly inimical to the established order of church and state. Johnson recommended that strict uniformity in religious externals was the best antidote to the objectionable religious traits that he linked to Whiggism.

Protectionism 
At their inception, the Whigs were protectionist in economic policy, with free trade policies being advocated by Tories. The Whigs were opposed to the pro-French policies of the Stuart kings Charles II and James II as they believed that such an alliance with the Catholic absolute monarchy of France endangered liberty and Protestantism. The Whigs claimed that trade with France was bad for England and developed an economic theory of overbalance, that is a deficit of trade with France was bad because it would enrich France at England's expense.

In 1678, the Whigs passed the Prohibition of 1678 that banned certain French goods from being imported into England. The economic historian William Ashley claimed that this Act witnessed the "real starting-point in the history of Whig policy in the matter of trade". It was repealed upon the accession of James II by a Tory-dominated House of Commons but upon the accession of William III in 1688 a new Act was passed that prohibited the importation of French goods. In 1704, the Whigs passed the Trade with France Act that renewed protectionism against France. In 1710, Queen Anne appointed the predominantly Tory Harley Ministry, which favoured free trade. When the Tory minister Lord Bolingbroke proposed a commercial treaty with France in 1713 that would have led to freer trade, the Whigs were vehemently against it and it had to be abandoned.

In 1786, Pitt's government negotiated the Eden Agreement, a commercial treaty with France which led to freer trade between the two countries. All of the Whig leaders attacked this on traditional Whig anti-French and protectionist grounds. Fox claimed that France was England's natural enemy and that it was only at Britain's expense that she could grow. Edmund Burke, Richard Sheridan, William Windham and Charles Grey all spoke out against the trade agreement on the same grounds.

Ashley claimed that "[t]he traditional policy of the Whig party from before the Revolution [of 1688] down to the time of Fox was an extreme form of Protectionism". The Whigs' protectionism of this period is today increasingly cited with approval by heterodox economists such as Ha-Joon Chang, who wish to challenge contemporary prevailing free trade orthodoxies via precedents from the past.

Later on, several members from the Whig party came to oppose the protectionism of the Corn Laws, but trade restrictions were not repealed even after the Whigs returned to power in the 1830s.

Whig Supremacy 

With the succession of Elector George Louis of Hanover as king in 1714, the Whigs returned to government with the support of some Hanoverian Tories. The Jacobite rising of 1715 discredited much of the Tory party as treasonous Jacobites, and the Septennial Act ensured that the Whigs became the dominant party, establishing the Whig oligarchy. Between 1717 and 1720 the Whig Split led to a division in the party. Government Whigs led by the former soldier James Stanhope were opposed by Robert Walpole and his allies. While Stanhope was backed by George I, Walpole and his supporters were closer to the Prince of Wales. Following his success in defeating the government over the Peerage Bill in 1719, Walpole was invited back into government the following year. He was able to defend the government in the Commons when the South Sea Bubble collapsed. When Stanhope died unexpectedly in 1721, Walpole replaced him as leader of the government and became known as the first Prime Minister. In the 1722 general election the Whigs swept to a decisive victory.

Between 1714 and 1760, the Tories struggled as an active political force, but always retained a considerable presence in the House of Commons. The governments of Walpole, Henry Pelham and his older brother the Duke of Newcastle dominated between 1721 and 1757 (with a brief break during the also-Whig Carteret ministry). The leading entities in these governments consistently referred to themselves as "Whigs".

George III's accession 
This arrangement changed during the reign of George III, who hoped to restore his own power by freeing himself from the great Whig magnates. Thus George promoted his old tutor Lord Bute to power and broke with the old Whig leadership surrounding the Duke of Newcastle. After a decade of factional chaos, with distinct Bedfordite, Chathamite, Grenvillite and Rockinghamite and factions successively in power and all referring to themselves as "Whigs", a new system emerged with two separate opposition groups. The Rockingham Whigs claimed the mantle of Old Whigs as the purported successors of the party of the Pelhams and the great Whig families. With such noted intellectuals as Edmund Burke behind them, the Rockingham Whigs laid out a philosophy which for the first time extolled the virtues of faction, or at least their faction. The other group were the followers of Lord Chatham, who as the great political hero of the Seven Years' War generally took a stance of opposition to party and faction.

The Whigs were opposed by the government of Lord North which they accused of being a Tory administration. While it largely consisted of individuals previously associated with the Whigs, many old Pelhamites as well as the Bedfordite Whig faction formerly led by the Duke of Bedford and elements of that which had been led by George Grenville, it also contained elements of the Kings' Men, the group formerly associated with Lord Bute and which was generally seen as Tory-leaning.

American impact 
The association of Toryism with Lord North's government was also influential in the American colonies and writings of British political commentators known as the Radical Whigs did much to stimulate colonial republican sentiment. Early activists in the colonies called themselves Whigs, seeing themselves as in alliance with the political opposition in Britain, until they turned to independence and started emphasising the label Patriots. In contrast, the American Loyalists, who supported the monarchy, were consistently also referred to as Tories.

Later, the United States Whig Party was founded in 1833 on the basis of opposition to a strong presidency, initially the presidency of Andrew Jackson, analogous to the British Whig opposition to a strong monarchy. The True Whig Party, which for a century dominated Liberia, was named for the American party rather than directly for the British one.

Two-party system 

Dickinson reports the following:

The North administration left power in March 1782 following the American Revolution and a coalition of the Rockingham Whigs and the former Chathamites, now led by the Earl of Shelburne, took its place. After Rockingham's unexpected death in July 1782, this uneasy coalition fell apart, with Charles James Fox, Rockingham's successor as faction leader, quarrelling with Shelburne and withdrawing his supporters from the government. The following Shelburne administration was short-lived and Fox returned to power in April 1783, this time in an unexpected coalition with his old enemy Lord North. Although this pairing seemed unnatural to many at the time, it was to last beyond the demise of the coalition in December 1783. The coalition's untimely fall was brought about by George III in league with the House of Lords and the King now brought in Chatham's son William Pitt the Younger as his prime minister.

It was only now that a genuine two-party system can be seen to emerge, with Pitt and the government on the one side, and the ousted Fox-North coalition on the other. On 17 December 1783, Fox stated in the House of Commons that "[i]f [...] a change must take place, and a new ministry is to be formed and supported, not by the confidence of this House or the public, but the sole authority of the Crown, I, for one, shall not envy that hon. gentleman his situation. From that moment I put in my claim for a monopoly of Whig principles". Although Pitt is often referred to as a Tory and Fox as a Whig, Pitt always considered himself to be an independent Whig and generally opposed the development of a strict partisan political system. Fox's supporters saw themselves as legitimate heirs of the Whig tradition and they strongly opposed Pitt in his early years in office, notably during the regency crisis revolving around the King's temporary insanity in 1788–1789, when Fox and his allies supported full powers as regent for their ally, the Prince of Wales.

The opposition Whigs were split by the onset of the French Revolution. While Fox and some younger members of the party such as Charles Grey and Richard Brinsley Sheridan were sympathetic to the French revolutionaries, others led by Edmund Burke were strongly opposed. Although Burke himself was largely alone in defecting to Pitt in 1791, much of the rest of the party, including the influential House of Lords leader the Duke of Portland, Rockingham's nephew Lord Fitzwilliam and William Windham, were increasingly uncomfortable with the flirtations of Fox and his allies with radicalism and the French Revolution. They split in early 1793 with Fox over the question of support for the war with France and by the end of the year they had openly broken with Fox. By the summer of the next year, large portions of the opposition had defected and joined Pitt's government.

19th century 
Many of the Whigs who had joined with Pitt would eventually return to the fold, joining again with Fox in the Ministry of All the Talents following Pitt's death in 1806. The followers of Pitt—led until 1809 by Fox's old colleague the Duke of Portland—rejected the label of Tories and preferred to call themselves The Friends of Mr. Pitt. After the fall of the Talents ministry in 1807, the Foxite Whigs remained out of power for the better part of 25 years. The accession of Fox's old ally, the Prince of Wales, to the regency in 1811 did not change the situation, as the Prince had broken entirely with his old Foxite Whig companions. The members of the government of Lord Liverpool from 1812 to 1827 called themselves Whigs.

Structure and appeal 
By 1815, the Whigs were still far from being a "party" in the modern sense. They had no definite programme or policy and were by no means even united. Generally, they stood for reducing crown patronage, sympathy towards nonconformists, support for the interests of merchants and bankers and a leaning towards the idea of a limited reform of the voting system. Most Whig leaders, such as Lord Grey, Lord Grenville, Lord Althorp, William Lamb (later Lord Melbourne) and Lord John Russell, were still rich landowners. The most prominent exception was Henry Brougham, the talented lawyer, who had a relatively modest background.

Hay argues that Whig leaders welcomed the increasing political participation of the English middle classes in the two decades after the defeat of Napoleon in 1815. The fresh support strengthened their position in Parliament. Whigs rejected the Tory appeals to governmental authority and social discipline and extended political discussion beyond Parliament. Whigs used a national network of newspapers and magazines as well as local clubs to deliver their message. The press organised petitions and debates and reported to the public on government policy, while leaders such as Henry Brougham (1778–1868) built alliances with men who lacked direct representation. This new approach to the grass roots helped to define Whiggism and opened the way for later success. Whigs thereby forced the government to recognise the role of public opinion in parliamentary debate and influenced views of representation and reform throughout the 19th century.

Return to power 
Whigs restored their unity by supporting moral reforms, especially the abolition of slavery. They triumphed in 1830 as champions of Parliamentary reform. They made Lord Grey prime minister 1830–1834 and the Reform Act 1832 championed by Grey became their signature measure. It broadened the franchise and ended the system of "rotten and pocket boroughs" (where elections were controlled by powerful families) and instead redistributed power on the basis of population. It added 217,000 voters to an electorate of 435,000 in England and Wales. Only the upper and middle classes voted, so this shifted power away from the landed aristocracy to the urban middle classes. In 1832, the party abolished enslavement in the British Empire with the Slavery Abolition Act 1833. It purchased and freed the slaves, especially those in the Caribbean sugar islands. After parliamentary investigations demonstrated the horrors of child labour, limited reforms were passed in 1833. The Whigs also passed the Poor Law Amendment Act 1834 that reformed the administration of relief to the poor.

It was around this time that the great Whig historian Thomas Babington Macaulay began to promulgate what would later be coined the Whig view of history, in which all of English history was seen as leading up to the culminating moment of the passage of Lord Grey's reform bill. This view led to serious distortions in later portrayals of 17th-century and 18th-century history, as Macaulay and his followers attempted to fit the complex and changing factional politics of the Restoration into the neat categories of 19th-century political divisions.

In 1836, a private gentleman's Club was constructed in Pall Mall, Piccadilly as a consequence of the successful Reform Act 1832. The Reform Club was founded by Edward Ellice Sr., MP for Coventry and Whig Whip, whose riches came from the Hudson's Bay Company but whose zeal was chiefly devoted to securing the passage of the Reform Act 1832. This new club, for members of both Houses of Parliament, was intended to be a forum for the radical ideas which the First Reform Bill represented: a bastion of liberal and progressive thought that became closely associated with the Liberal Party, who largely succeeded the Whigs in the second half of the 19th century.

Until the decline of the Liberal Party in the early 20th century, it was de rigueur for Liberal MPs and peers to be members of the Reform Club, being regarded as an unofficial party headquarters. However, in 1882 the National Liberal Club was established under William Ewart Gladstone's chairmanship, designed to be more "inclusive" towards Liberal grandees and activists throughout the United Kingdom.

Transition to the Liberal Party 
The Liberal Party (the term was first used officially in 1868, but had been used colloquially for decades beforehand) arose from a coalition of Whigs, free trade Tory followers of Robert Peel and free trade Radicals, first created, tenuously under the Peelite Earl of Aberdeen in 1852 and put together more permanently under the former Canningite Tory Lord Palmerston in 1859. Although the Whigs at first formed the most important part of the coalition, the Whiggish elements of the new party progressively lost influence during the long leadership of former Peelite William Ewart Gladstone. Subsequently the majority of the old Whig aristocracy broke from the party over the issue of Irish home rule in 1886 to help form the Liberal Unionist Party, which in turn would merge with the Conservative Party by 1912. However, the Unionist support for trade protection in the early twentieth century under Joseph Chamberlain (probably the least Whiggish character in the Liberal Unionist party) further alienated the more orthodox Whigs. By the early twentieth century "Whiggery" was largely irrelevant and without a natural political home. One of the last active politicians to celebrate his Whiggish roots was the Liberal Unionist statesman Henry James.

In popular culture 
"The British Whig March" for piano was written by Oscar Telgmann in Kingston, Ontario, c. 1900.

The colours of the Whig party (blue and buff, a yellow-brown colour named after buff leather) were particularly associated with Charles James Fox.

Poet Robert Burns in "Here's a health to them that's awa" wrote: 

Punk band The Men That Will Not Be Blamed For Nothing have a song named "Doing It for the Whigs".

Electoral performance

Parliament of England

Parliament of Great Britain

Parliament of the United Kingdom

See also 
 Early-18th-century Whig plots
 Foxite
 King of Clubs (Whig club)
 Kingdom of Great Britain
 List of United Kingdom Whig and allied party leaders (1801–1859)
 Patriot Whigs
 Whig government
 Whig party (United States)

References

Bibliography 

 
 
 
 
 
 Elofson, Warren M. The Rockingham Connection and the Second Founding of the Whig Party 1768–1773 (1996).
 Fairlie, Henry.  "Oratory in Political Life," History Today (Jan 1960) 10#1 pp 3–13. A survey of political oratory in Britain from 1730 to 1960. 
 Feiling, Keith; A History of the Tory Party, 1640–1714, 1924 online edition .
 Feiling, Keith; The Second Tory Party, 1714–1832, 1938 online edition .
 Forbes, Suzanne. "Whigs and Tories, 1709–1712." inPrint and Party Politics in Ireland, 1689-1714 (Palgrave Macmillan, Cham, 2018) pp. 195–227.
 
 
 Holmes, Geoffrey.  "British Politics in the Age of Anne" (2nd ed. 1987).
 Jones; J. R. The First Whigs: The Politics of the Exclusion Crisis, 1678–1683, 1961 online edition.
 McCallum; Ronald Buchanan. The Liberal Party from Earl Grey to Asquith (1963).
 Marshall, Dorothy. Eighteenth Century England (1962) online. A standard scholarly history.
 
 
 O'Gorman, Frank. Voters, patrons, and parties: the unreformed electoral system of Hanoverian England 1734–1832 (Clarendon Press, 1989).
 Plumb, J.H. Growth of Political Stability in England 1675–1725 (2001).
 Reid; Loren Dudley. Charles James Fox: A Man for the People, 1969 online edition.
 Roszman, Jay R. "'Ireland as a Weapon of Warfare': Whigs, Tories, and the Problem of Irish Outrages, 1835 To 1839." Historical Journal 60.4 (2017): 971–995.
 Speck, W. A.  Stability and Strife: England, 1714–1760 (1977), A standard scholarly history.
 Trevelyan, George Otto.  The Early History of Charles James Fox (1880) online edition.
 Williams, Basil, and C. H. Stuart; The Whig Supremacy, 1714–1760 (1962) online edition . A standard scholarly survey
 Willman, Robert. "The Origins of 'Whig' and 'Tory' in English Political Language." Historical Journal 17, no. 2 (1974): 247–64. online.
 Woodward; E. L. The Age of Reform, 1815–1870, 1938 online edition . A standard scholarly stream.

Historiography 
 Hill, Brain W. "II. Executive Monarchy and the Challenge of Parties, 1689–1832: Two Concepts of Government and Two Historiographical Interpretations." The Historical Journal (1970) 13#3 pp: 379–401. abstract.
 Hone, Joseph. "John Darby and the Whig Canon." Historical Journal 1-24. online 
 Loades, David ed. Readers Guide to British History (2003) 2:1353–56.
 Pocock, J. G. A. "The varieties of whiggism from exclusion to reform: a history of ideology and discourse", in Virtue, commerce, and history: essays on political thought and history, chiefly in the eighteenth century (Cambridge, 1985), pp. 215–310; 
 Thomas, Peter D. G. "Party Politics in Eighteenth‐Century Britain: Some Myths and a Touch of Reality." Journal for Eighteenth‐Century Studies (1987) 10#2 pp. 201–210.

Primary sources
 Eagles, Robin. The Writings and Speeches of Edmund Burke. General Editor Paul Langford. Volume IV: Party, Parliament, and the Dividing of the Whigs 1780–1794 Edited by PJ Marshall and Donald C. Bryant. (Oxford University Press. 2015). xvi, 674 pp.

External links 

 Karl Marx on the Tories and the Whigs (1852)

 
1678 establishments in England
1859 disestablishments in the United Kingdom
Centre-left parties in the United Kingdom
Centrist political parties in the United Kingdom
Classical liberal parties
Conservative liberal parties
Defunct liberal political parties
Defunct political parties in the United Kingdom
Liberal parties in the United Kingdom
Politics of the Kingdom of Great Britain
Political parties established in 1678
Political parties disestablished in 1859
Protestant political parties